Below is a list of species in the large bee genus Nomada.

References
Nomada. Integrated Taxonomic Information System (ITIS)

Nomadinae